Lorcha or L'Orxa is a municipality in the comarca of Comtat in the Valencian Community, Spain.

Municipalities in the Province of Alicante